The 15235 / 15236 Howrah–Darbhanga Weekly Express is an Express train belonging to East Central Railway zone that runs between  and  in India. It is currently being operated with 15235/15236 train numbers on a weekly basis.

Service

The 15235/Howrah–Darbhanga Express has an average speed of 47 km/hr and covers 536 km in 11h 30m. The 15236/Darbhanga–Howrah Express has an average speed of 48 km/hr and covers 536 km in 11h 15m.

Route & halts

The important halts of the train are:

Coach composition

The train has LHB rakes with a max speed of 160 kmph. The train consists of 19 coaches:

 1 AC II Tier
 1 AC III Tier
 9 Sleeper coaches
 6 General Unreserved
 2 Seating cum Luggage Rake

Traction

Both trains are hauled by a Howrah Loco Shed-based WAP-4 electric locomotive from Howrah to Barauni. From Barauni, train is hauled by a Samastipur Loco Shed-based WDM-3A diesel locomotive from Darbhanga and vice versa.

Rake sharing

The train shares its rake with 15233/15234 Maithili Express.

See also 

 Darbhanga Junction railway station
 Howrah Junction railway station
 Maithili Express

Notes

References

External links 

 15235/Howrah-Darbhanga Express India Rail Info
 15236/Darbhanga-Howrah Express India Rail Info

Transport in Darbhanga
Rail transport in Howrah
Express trains in India
Rail transport in West Bengal
Rail transport in Bihar
Rail transport in Jharkhand
Railway services introduced in 2011